Darrin is both a masculine given name and a surname. People with the name include:

Given name

A–M
 Darrin Bell (born 1975), American editorial cartoonist 
 Darrin Kenneth O'Brien (born 1969), known by his stage name Snow (musician), Canadian musician
 Darrin Brown (born 1970), Canadian actor
 Darrin Camilleri (born 1992), American politician
 Darrin Canniff (born c. 1966), Canadian politician
 Darrin Chapin (born 1966), American baseball player
 Darrin Chiaverini (born 1977), American football player and coach
 Darrin Fitzgerald, American basketball player
 Darrin Fletcher (born 1966), American baseball player
 Darrin P. Gayles (born 1966), American judge
 Darrin Govens (born 1988), American-Hungarian basketball player
 Darrin Hancock (born 1971), American basketball player
 Darrin Henson (born 1973), American choreographer and actor
 Darrin Hodgetts, New Zealand psychology academic
 Darrin Horn (born 1972), American college basketball head coach 
 Darrin Huss (born 1965), Canadian musical artist
 Darrin Jackson (born 1963), African-American baseball player
 Darrin DeLatte, former member of the American hard rock group Lillian Axe 
 Darrin MacLeod (born 1994), Canadian soccer player 
 Darrin Maharaj, Canadian television host and reporter
 Darrin McMahon (born 1965), American historian
 Darrin Mooney (born 1967), English musical artist
 Darrin Morris (1966–2000), American boxer
 Darrin Murray (born 1967), New Zealand cricketer

N–Z
 Darrin Nelson (born 1959), American football player
 Darrin Patrick (1970–2020), American author and pastor
 Darrin Pfeiffer (born 1969), American musician
 Darrin Plab (born 1970), American athlete
 Darrin Pritchard (born 1966), Australian rules footballer
 Darrin Ramshaw (born 1965), Australian cricketer
 Darrin Reaves (born 1993), American football player
 Darrin Rose, Canadian actor
 Darrin Shannon (born 1969), Canadian ice hockey player
 Darrin Smith (born 1970), American football player
 Darrin Steele (born 1969), American bobsledder 
 Darrin Van Horn (born 1968), American boxer
 Darrin Verhagen (born 1967), Australian musical artist
 Darrin Walls (born 1988), American football player
 Darrin Wiener, known as Plastiq Phantom, American musical artist
 Darrin Williams, American lawyer and politician 
 Darrin Winston (1966–2008), American baseball player
 Darrin Zammit Lupi (born 1968), Maltese photographer and journalist

Surname
 Diana Darrin (born 1933), American actress and singer
 Howard "Dutch" Darrin (1897–1982), American automotive stylist
 Sonia Darrin (1924–2020), American actress

Fictional characters
 Darrin "Doughboy" Baker, one of the main characters in Boyz n the Hood
 Darrin Stephens, one of the main characters in Bewitched
 Darrin Tyler, one of the main characters in Wonderfalls 

Masculine given names